Ventria Bioscience is a biotech company with a focus on human nutrition and human therapeutics. The company was established in 1993 in Colorado. The company's core technology is a genetically modified crop-based protein production system (also called a "pharming" system) called ExpressTec.

ExpressTec uses self-pollinating crops such as rice and barley to minimize the risk of gene flow normally associated with transgenic plants. Plant-produced proteins also offer advantages for cell culture and bioprocessing use because they replace animal derived components, which have become unpopular due to concerns about prion contamination.

Facilities
Ventria's corporate headquarters is in Denver, Colorado, with additional facilities in Kansas.  On September 29, 2006, Kansas officials announced an agreement to bring Ventria’s new bioprocessing facility to Junction City, Kansas.  Kansas Governor Kathleen Sebelius was very supportive of the agreement and was quoted as stating "I welcome Ventria Bioscience to Kansas and look forward to their contributions to the health of children worldwide."  The effort to attract Ventria to Kansas involved a number of players, including Governor Kathleen Sebelius, Secretary of Agriculture Adrian Polansky, The Kansas Department of Commerce, Junction City and Geary County, Kansas Technology Enterprise Corporation (KTEC), KansasBIO, Kansas State University, and Kansas Farm Bureau.

Markets and products
As of 2012 Ventria is developing six therapeutic products:
 Human Health
 VEN100 Recombinant human lactoferrin for antibiotic-associated diarrhea
 VEN101 for Chemotherapy-Induced Diarrhea
 VEN120 for Inflammatory Bowel Disease
 VEN130 for Osteoporosis
 VEN140 for Hepatic disease
 VEN200 Optibumin Recombinant human albumin as a replacement for therapeutic human serum albumin

The company offers contract biomanufacturing services using its ExpressTec platform, and, through its subsidiary InVitria, sells a line of its proteins that it manufactures for the life sciences research market.

The company has conducted research in the field of zoonotic disease, specifically in lyme disease and rabies, with a goal of developing vaccines and offers some its recombinant proteins to life sciences researchers under a program called BioShare.

See also 
 Ventria website

References

External links
 Ventria Bioscience Official site

Pharmaceutical companies of the United States
Biotechnology companies of the United States
Privately held companies based in Colorado
Companies based in Fort Collins, Colorado
Pharmaceutical companies established in 1993
Biotechnology companies established in 1993
Health care companies based in Colorado
1993 establishments in Colorado